Morondava Airport is an airport in Morondava, Menabe Region, Madagascar .

Airlines and destinations

References

External links

Airports in Madagascar
Menabe